International Property Exchange refers to the global real estate transactions among vendors, sales agency, sales professionals and consumers around the world. In recent years, international property exchange applies impeccable Internet technology and innovative business models to seamlessly connect real estate vendors, sales professionals and consumers.

References 
The role of international property in investment portfolios

Property Investment: Principles and Practice of Portfolio Management

Real Estate Concepts: A Handbook

Real estate industry